Murariu is a Romanian surname. Notable people with the surname include:

Claudea Murariu (born 1970), Romanian volleyball player
Elena Murariu (born 1963), Romanian painter and iconographer
Florică Murariu (1955–1989), Romanian rugby union player

Romanian-language surnames